Kleopatra is a Danish-language opera by August Enna to a libretto by Einar Christiansen based on the 1889 novel by H. Rider Haggard. The opera premiered in the Royal Theatre in 1895 and was performed around 20 times. In German translation the opera was performed in Berlin, Hamburg, Cologne, Wroclaw, Riga, Zurich, Antwerp, Rotterdam and The Hague; In 1897 the opera ran for 50 performances in the opera house in Amsterdam.

Plot
The opera tells the story of Prince Harmaki, who enters Queen Cleopatra's palace in order to murder her. His objective is regain power from the Romans.

Recordings
 Kleopatra – Elsa Dreisig, Magnus Vigilius, Lars Möller, Kirsten Grönfeldt, Chorus of the Danish National Opera, Odense Symphony Orchestra,  conducting, 2 CDs DaCapo, DDD, 2019 (original stage production by Den Jyske Opera with Philipp Kochheim conducting)

References

1895 operas
Danish-language operas
H. Rider Haggard
Operas based on novels
Depictions of Cleopatra in opera
Operas